Longridge is a surname.

 Louis Longridge is a Scottish professional footballer who plays for Hamilton Academical
 Michael Longridge (1785–1858), founder of R. B. Longridge and Company
 Robert Bewick Longridge (1821–1914), director of R. B. Longridge and Company
 Thomas Longridge (1751–1803), partner in Bedlington Ironworks